Stefanos Regakos (born 23 October 1997) is a Greek professional footballer who plays as a striker.

References

1997 births
Living people
Greek expatriate footballers
Greece youth international footballers
Cypriot Second Division players
Atromitos F.C. players
FC Lausanne-Sport players
ASIL Lysi players
Alki Oroklini players
Association football forwards
Greek expatriate sportspeople in Switzerland
Greek expatriate sportspeople in Cyprus
Expatriate footballers in Switzerland
Expatriate footballers in Cyprus
Footballers from Athens
Greek footballers